

The 21st Century Airships SPAS 13 is a Canadian semi-rigid helium airship demonstrator designed and built by 21st Century Airships of Newmarket, Ontario.

Design and development
The SPAS 13 was a development of the earlier SPAS 1 and was designed to demonstrate the advantages of a spherical airship. The 43 ft (13.11 m) diameter spherical envelope is made of Spectra fabric with an inner helium containing envelope of Mylar film reinforced with Kevlar. The two-seat cockpit is internal to the envelope with panoramic windows in the envelope to provide an external view.

The SPAS 13 is powered by two  Rotax 503 piston engines on external struts, four vanes behind each  engine are used to provide control by deflecting the thrust.

Specifications

References

Notes

Bibliography

Airships of Canada
1990s Canadian experimental aircraft
Aircraft first flown in 1994